Making the Grade is a 1984 American teen comedy film. It was directed by Dorian Walker and written by Charles Gale and Gene Quintano. It was filmed at Rhodes College in Memphis, Tennessee.

Plot
Palmer Woodrow (Dana Olsen) is a rich prep school kid who rarely attends class and has been expelled from numerous prep schools. His parents are traveling internationally and inform him that he has been enrolled at Hoover Academy and he has one last chance to graduate or he will be cut off financially. Meanwhile, Eddie Keaton (Judd Nelson) is a small-time con artist and high school dropout who has run afoul of a local loanshark named "Dice." Via a chance meeting, Woodrow hires Keaton for $10,000 and a Porsche to attend his prep school and graduate, freeing Woodrow to travel to Europe for skiing.

Cast

Production
This film marks the first appearance of Andrew Clay's "Dice" persona.

During an appearance on the Match Game-Hollywood Squares Hour, Gordon Jump mentioned the working title of the film was The Last American Preppie and that they were looking for a new title.

At the start of the film's final credits, the characters Palmer and Eddie are touted as returning in the upcoming movie, Tourista.  However, after low theatrical interest in the duo and repeated missed deadlines (of which Olsen tried to contribute as a writer), the script for Tourista was never completed.  The pair never teamed up in filmmaking again.

References

External links

1984 films
1980s coming-of-age comedy films
1980s teen comedy films
American coming-of-age comedy films
American teen comedy films
Films about con artists
Films scored by Basil Poledouris
Films shot in Tennessee
Films set in Memphis, Tennessee
Metro-Goldwyn-Mayer films
Golan-Globus films
United Artists films
Films with screenplays by Gene Quintano
Films produced by Gene Quintano
1984 directorial debut films
1984 comedy films
1980s English-language films
1980s American films